CineMayhem is a film festival that celebrates independent horror films.

Background 
CineMayhem, a film festival for independent horror films, was founded by Heather Wixson in association with Dread Central's Indie Horror Month.  Wixson is a former contributor to Dread Central and currently now writes with Daily Dead.  The first festival was presented in Thousand Oaks, California, and the inaugural date was March 2–3, 2013.  The first festival was sponsored by Scream Factory, Sideshow Collectibles, Magnet Releasing, and Breaking Glass Pictures.  The event is held at the Muvico theater, which Wixson arranged through connections from her hometown.  An after-party at the Muvico takes place following the event.  The festival is designed to offer a theatrical showing to independent films that would ordinarily lack the resources for one.

Festival

2013 
Sideshow Collectibles offered a $50 gift card to anyone who purchased a Saturday or Sunday pass.  CineMayhem 2013 was the world premiere for Eric England's Roadside.  Following its premiere, there was a Q&A session with England.

Lineup:

Saturday
 The Sleeper
 Breath of Hate
 Coldwater
 Roadside
 The ABCs of Death
Sunday
 Shorts: Foxes, Wrong Number, Familiar, Killer Kart, Him Indoors, Split the Check, Meet, The Root of the Problem
 Behind the Mask: The Rise of Leslie Vernon
 K-11
 Resolution

2014 
, submissions for the 2014 festival are currently open.  The deadline is December 31, 2013.

References

External links 
 

Film festivals in Los Angeles
Fantasy and horror film festivals in the United States
Film festivals established in 2013
2013 establishments in the United States